The following is a list of amphibians of Sumatra, Indonesia from Kurniati (2007) and Teynié (2010). Many of the species can be found in Kerinci Seblat National Park and Gunung Leuser National Park.

Order Anura

Family Megophryidae

Leptobrachium abbotti
Leptobrachium hasseltii
Leptobrachium hendricksoni
Megophrys nasuta
Xenophrys aceras
Xenophrys parallela

Family Bufonidae

Ansonia glandulosa  — endemic
Ansonia leptopus
Duttaphrynus melanostictus
Duttaphrynus sumatranus
Duttaphrynus totol
Duttaphrynus valhallae
Ingerophrynus biporcatus
Ingerophrynus claviger  — endemic
Ingerophrynus divergens
Ingerophrynus parvus
Ingerophrynus quadriporcatus
Leptophryne borbonica
Pedostibes hosii
Phrynoidis asper
Phrynoidis juxtasper
Pseudobufo subasper

Family Microhylidae

Calluella volzi
Kalophrynus minusculus
Kalophrynus pleurostigma
Kalophrynus punctatus
Kaloula baleata
Kaloula pulchra
Metaphrynella pollicaris
Metaphrynella sundana
Microhyla achatina
Microhyla berdmorei
Microhyla heymonsi
Microhyla palmipes
Microhyla superciliaris
Micryletta inornata
Micryletta sumatrana
Phrynella pulchra

Family Dicroglossidae

Fejervarya cancrivora
Fejervarya limnocharis
Limnonectes blythii
Limnonectes kuhlii
Limnonectes laticeps
Limnonectes macrodon
Limnonectes malesianus
Limnonectes microdiscus
Limnonectes paramacrodon
Limnonectes shompenorum
Limnonectes tweediei
Occidozyga baluensis
Occidozyga laevis
Occidozyga lima
Occidozyga sumatrana

Family Ranidae

Huia modiglianii  — endemic
Huia sumatrana  — endemic
Hylarana baramica
Hylarana chalconota
Hylarana crassiovis  — endemic
Hylarana debussyi
Hylarana erythraea
Hylarana glandulosa
Hylarana kampeni  — endemic
Hylarana luctuosa
Hylarana nicobariensis
Hylarana nigrovittata
Hylarana persimilis
Hylarana picturata
Hylarana raniceps
Hylarana siberu  — endemic
Odorrana hosii

Family Rhacophoridae

Nyctixalus pictus
Philautus aurifasciatus
Philautus cornutus  — endemic
Philautus similis
Polypedates colletti
Polypedates leucomystax
Polypedates macrotis
Polypedates pseudotilophus
Rhacophorus achantharrhena  — endemic
Rhacophorus angulirostris
Rhacophorus appendiculatus
Rhacophorus barisani  — endemic
Rhacophorus bifasciatus  — endemic
Rhacophorus catamitus  — endemic
Rhacophorus cyanopunctatus
Rhacophorus modestus  — endemic
Rhacophorus nigropalmatus
Rhacophorus pardalis
Rhacophorus poecilonotus  — endemic
Rhacophorus prominanus
Rhacophorus reinwardtii
Theloderma asperum
Theloderma horridum
Theloderma leporosum

Order Gymnophiona

Family Ichthyophiidae
Ichthyophis billitonensis
Ichthyophis elongatus
Ichthyophis paucisulcus
Ichthyophis sumatranus

References

Fauna of Sumatra
Amphibians of Indonesia
Indonesia